The GAZ-AAA was a truck produced by GAZ. From 1936 to 1943, 37,373 units were built. Like the GAZ-AA and GAZ-MM it was largely based on the Ford Model AA truck.

References

External links 
 GAZ-AAA in the Vladivostok Museum of Automotive Antiques 

GAZ Group trucks
1930s cars